Kenraaliluutnantti (Lieutenant General) is an officer's rank in Finland, immediately above  (Major General) and below  (General). In Finland, the rank is translated as lieutenant general. A  is usually a commander of army or chief of staff of Finnish Defence Forces.

History and related ranks

Origin 
 and when sending their lieutenant (literally meaning 'place holder', i.e. in lieu or on behalf of someone) as their representative, the lieutenant was titled general lieutenant to distinguish him from the lieutenants of ordinary captains.

See also 
 Finnish military ranks

Military ranks of Finland

fi:Kenraaliluutnantti